Na Tum Jaano Na Hum is a 2002 Indian Hindi-language romantic drama film starring Saif Ali Khan, Hrithik Roshan, and Esha Deol. This is the first film where Roshan and Khan act together. The film was directed by Arjun Sablok and produced by Future Group owner Kishore Biyani. The title of the film was taken from a song of Roshan's debut film Kaho Naa... Pyaar Hai (2000). Upon release, it met with highly negative reviews and was a box office disaster despite having a stellar cast.

Plot 
Esha Malhotra is a bright, spirited girl who has just left college. She finds a note from a past student of her school that coincides with her own feelings of love. She calls into a radio station and requests a song, repeating the words left on the note. An anonymous man calls in soon after, stating that he is the one who had written the letter and he would like to meet her someday since they seem to have the same feelings about love and other aspects in life. The radio announcer sets up a date and time for their meeting at the radio station. The man arrives but finds only a letter waiting for him. The letter does not state her name or address, only a post box number to which she requests him to write so that they can be friends. The correspondence begins. The man turns out to be a photographer and commercial pilot Rahul Sharma. They do not meet, exchange numbers, or tell their names but continue to write to each other. Fate brings the two together when Esha hires Rahul to be their photographer for a campaign. Of course, she didn't know it was him nor he did that it was her.

Esha's grandfather wants her to get married and thus he arranges for her to meet Akshay Kapoor, a flirt and womaniser who also happens to be Rahul's best friend. Esha has fallen in love with her pen pal and does not want to marry Akshay. However, Akshay is falling for Esha. A lovestruck Rahul arranges to meet the one to whom he writes letters. Much to his shock though, he finds out it is Esha. Because of his friendship with Akshay, who is deeply in love with Esha, Rahul decides to forget her. Esha, unable to contact her anonymous love, agrees to wed Akshay. Rahul leaves for Vancouver the day before the wedding, vowing never to be seen again.

Four years later, in a mall in Canada, Rahul meets Akshay, who now has a son. Rahul thinks he is about to meet Esha but instead meets Akshay's former girlfriend Tanya, who is now his wife. Akshay explains that he could not marry Esha in the end because she still loves her mystery writer. Suddenly, a group of workers in the mall carry in a large portrait of Esha, and Akshay realises that Rahul is the mystery writer Esha fell in love with. He urges Rahul to hurry back to India so Rahul does so and reunites with Esha.

Cast 
Saif Ali Khan as Akshay Kapoor
Hrithik Roshan as Rahul Sharma
Esha Deol as Esha Malhotra
Alok Nath as Sanjay Malhotra, Esha’s grandfather 
Ashima Bhalla as Tanya
Bhavna Ruparel
Rati Agnihotri as Maya
Moushumi Chatterjee as Mrs. Malhotra, Esha’s mother
Shilarna Vaze as Riya
Anang Desai as Mr. Sanjeev Kapoor, Akshay’s father 
Smita Jaykar as Mrs. Kapoor, Akshay’s mother

Soundtrack 
According to the Indian trade website Box Office India, with around 9,00,000 units sold, this film's soundtrack album was the year's fifteenth highest-selling.

Reception 
The film, which was funded by retail magnate Kishore Biyani, was a critical and commercial failure.

References

External links 
 
 

2002 films
2000s Hindi-language films
2002 romantic comedy-drama films
Films scored by Rajesh Roshan
Indian romantic comedy-drama films
2002 directorial debut films
2002 comedy films